Artyomovsky is an urban locality (urban-type settlement) in Bodaybinsky District of Irkutsk Oblast, Russia. Population:

Administrative status
As a municipal division, Artyomovsky is the capital of the Artyomovsky Urban Settlement (Артёмовское городское поселение) municipal unit, which includes the Kropotkin urban locality, as well as the villages of Aprilsk and Marakan.

Geography 
The Kropotkin Range rises near the settlement.

See also
Patom Highlands

References

Notes

Sources

Registry of the Administrative-Territorial Formations of Irkutsk Oblast 

Urban-type settlements in Irkutsk Oblast